A sidecar is a one-wheeled device attached to the side of a motorcycle, scooter, or bicycle.  Sidecar may also refer to:

Sidecar (company), a defunct transportation network company that was based in San Francisco
Sidecar (cocktail), an alcoholic drink
Sidecar (sparkling water), a small glass of sparkling water served with an espresso
Reinsurance sidecar, a type of insurance
Sidecar file, a computer file format
Amiga Sidecar, an expansion hardware device for the Amiga 1000 personal computer
Blackburn Sidecar, an early aircraft
Sidecar TT, a motorcycle sidecar road race
Sidecar, An apple technology allowing Mac computers running macOS Catalina or later to output display to an iPad